Gao Changlong is a Paralympian athlete from China competing mainly in category F42-44 javelin throw events.

He competed in the 2008 Summer Paralympics in Beijing, China. There he won a bronze medal in the men's F42-44 javelin throw event.

External links
 

Paralympic athletes of China
Athletes (track and field) at the 2008 Summer Paralympics
Athletes (track and field) at the 2012 Summer Paralympics
Paralympic bronze medalists for China
Living people
Chinese male javelin throwers
Paralympic javelin throwers
Year of birth missing (living people)
Medalists at the 2008 Summer Paralympics
Paralympic medalists in athletics (track and field)
21st-century Chinese people
Medalists at the World Para Athletics Championships
Medalists at the 2010 Asian Para Games